Edward John Routh  (20 January 18317 June 1907), was an English mathematician, noted as the outstanding coach of students preparing for the Mathematical Tripos examination of the University of Cambridge in its heyday in the middle of the nineteenth century. He also did much to systematise the mathematical theory of mechanics and created several ideas critical to the development of modern control systems theory.

Biography

Early life
Routh was born of an English father and a French-Canadian mother in Quebec, at that time the British colony of Lower Canada. His father's family could trace its history back to the Norman conquest when it acquired land at Routh near Beverley, Yorkshire. His mother's family, the Taschereau family, was well-established in Quebec, tracing their ancestry back to the early days of the French colony.  His parents were Sir Randolph Isham Routh (1782–1858) and his second wife, Marie Louise Taschereau (1810–1891). Sir Randolph was Commissary General of the British Army 1826, Chairman of the Irish Famine Relief Commission (1845–48) and Deputy Commissary General, the senior Commissariat officer at the Battle of Waterloo, and Marie Louise was the daughter of Judge Jean-Thomas Taschereau and the sister of Judge Jean-Thomas and Cardinal Elzéar-Alexandre Taschereau.

Routh came to England aged eleven and attended University College School and then entered University College, London in 1847, having won a scholarship. There he studied under Augustus De Morgan, whose influence led to Routh to decide on a career in mathematics.

Routh obtained his BA (1849) and MA (1853) in London. He attended Peterhouse, Cambridge, where he was taught by Isaac Todhunter and coached by "senior wrangler maker" William Hopkins. While at Peterhouse, Routh rowed for Peterhouse Boat Club. In 1854, Routh graduated just above James Clerk Maxwell, as Senior Wrangler, sharing the Smith's prize with him. Routh was elected fellow of Peterhouse in 1856.

Mathematics tutor
On graduation, Routh took up work as a private mathematics tutor in Cambridge and took on the pupils of William John Steele during the latter's fatal illness, though insisting that Steele take the fees. Routh inherited Steele's pupils, going on to establish an unbeaten record as a coach. He coached over 600 pupils between 1855 and 1888, 28 of them making Senior wrangler, as to Hopkins' 17 with 43 of his pupils winning Smith's Prize.

Routh worked conscientiously and systematically, taking rigidly timetabled classes of ten pupils during the day and spending the evenings preparing extra material for the ablest men. "His lectures were enlivened by mathematical jokes of a rather heavy kind."

Routh was a staunch defender of the Cambridge competitive system and despaired when the university started to publish examination results in alphabetical order, observing "They will want to run the Derby alphabetically next".

Private life
Astronomer Royal George Biddell Airy sought to entice Routh to work at the Royal Observatory, Greenwich. Though Airy did not succeed, at Greenwich Routh met Airy's eldest daughter Hilda (1840–1916) whom he married in 1864. At the time, the university had a celibacy requirement, forcing Routh to vacate his fellowship and move out of Peterhouse. On the reformation of the college statutes, removing the celibacy requirement, Routh was the first person elected to an honorary fellowship by Peterhouse. The couple had five sons and a daughter. Routh was a "kindly man and a good conversationalist with friends, but with strangers he was shy and reserved."

Honours
Fellow of the Royal Society, (1872);
Adams Prize, (1877).

Work

Mechanics 
Routh collaborated with Henry Brougham on the Analytical View of Sir Isaac Newton's Principia (1855). He published a textbook, Dynamics of a System of Rigid Bodies (1860, 6th ed. 1897) in which he did much to define and systematise the modern mathematical approach to mechanics. This influenced Felix Klein and Arnold Sommerfeld. In fact, Klein arranged the German translation. It also did much to influence William Thomson and Peter Guthrie Tait's Treatise on Natural Philosophy (1867).

Routh noted the importance of what he called "absent coordinates," also known as cyclic coordinates or ignorable coordinates (following the terminology of E. T. Whittaker in his Analytical Dynamics of Particles and Rigid Bodies). Such coordinates are associated with conserved momenta and as such are useful in problem solving. Routh also devised a new method for solving problems in mechanics. Although Routh's procedure does not add any new insights, it allows for more systematic and convenient analysis, especially in problems with many degrees of freedom and at least some cyclic coordinates.

Stability and control
In addition to his intensive work in teaching and writing, which had a persistent effect on the presentation of mathematical physics, he also contributed original research such as the Routh–Hurwitz theorem.

Central tenets of modern control systems theory relied upon the Routh stability criterion (though nowadays due to modern computers it is not as important), an application of Sturm's theorem to evaluate Cauchy indices through the use of the Euclidean algorithm.

Works

 
 Reprinted in 'Stability of Motion' (ed. A.T.Fuller) London 1975 (Taylor & Francis).

References

Further reading

Obituaries
The Times, 8 June 1907 (available at O'Connor & Robertson (2003))
Proceedings of the London Mathematical Society, 2nd ser., 5 (1907), xiv–xx;
Nature, 76 (1907), 200–02;
Cambridge Review, 13 June 1907, 480–81;
HHT, Monthly Notices of the Royal Astronomical Society, 68 (1907–08), 239–41

About Routh

Sneddon, I. N. (1970–1990) "Routh, Edward John", in Gillispie, C. C. (ed.) Dictionary of Scientific Biography, New York: Charles Screibner's Sons

External links
 

1831 births
1907 deaths
19th-century English mathematicians
20th-century English mathematicians
Edward
Alumni of Peterhouse, Cambridge
Alumni of University College London
Control theorists
Fellows of the Royal Society
Fellows of Peterhouse, Cambridge
People educated at University College School
Senior Wranglers
Taschereau family